''Brave Bison'' (formerly known as Rightster) is a social and digital media company. It combines a social media marketing agency and content studio with a media network of over 650 channels and 158m followers. The company is headquartered in London with hubs in Singapore, Thailand, Bulgaria, Egypt and South Africa.

History 
The company was founded under the name Rightster in May 2011 by British entrepreneur Charlie Muirhead with the vision of enabling media businesses to “overcome huge fragmentation in the online video market with a single technology platform for engaging audiences and transacting with optimal efficiency”. The initial focus of the business was on the fashion industry, Rightster's first customer being the British Fashion Council (BFC).

IPO 
In November 2013, Rightster raised £22.4 million ($36 million) via an IPO on London's Alternative Investment Market (AIM), making it the first YouTube MCN to go public. Rightster said it intended to use money raised via the IPO to fund platform upgrades and acquisitions.

In May 2016, it was announced that the company was relaunching under the name Brave Bison.

In June 2019, UK entrepreneurs Oli & Theo Green acquired a 27.3% shareholding in Brave Bison through their digital media and technology group, Tangent. Oli joined the board of Brave Bison in December 2019 and in January 2020 it was announced that Oli would take over from Sir Robin Miller as chairman. Theo Green joined as chief growth officer soon afterwards.

Acquisitions

VML 
In October 2012, Rightster acquired approximately 25 percent of the share capital of VML. VML operates under the brandname ‘Viral Spiral' and connects third party brands, agencies, production companies and publishers with the owners of viral content. Rightster entered into an agreement with VML such that it is the exclusive global syndication distribution and monetisation partner for all VML content being uploaded to third party publishers platforms, including YouTube.

Preview Networks 
In February 2013, Rightster acquired Preview Networks, a European distributor of film trailers and branded content.
"The deal extends Rightster's YouTube services across Europe and makes Rightster the leading distributor of movie trailers in this region. Preview Networks brings over 300 content rights holders and 2500 publishers to Rightster's global community and broadens Rightster's geographic presence in key European markets including France, Germany, Italy, Spain and the Nordics."

Sport Syndicator 
In September 2013, Rightster acquired Sport Syndicator, a UK display advertising sales agency,:

The Hook 
In April 2020, Brave Bison acquired The Hook Group, a social marketing and publishing company, for £0.15m. The company was acquired out of administration.

Greenlight 
In August 2021, Brave Bison acquired digital advertising and technology company Greenlight for just over $9 million. With more than 120 employees in the UK and across Eastern Europe, Greenlight works with blue-chip brands and omni-channel retailers on digital advertising and eCommerce technology systems. Greenlight clients include Dixons Carphone, Muller, GAP, Furniture Village and New Balance.

Social Chain 
In February 2023, it was confirmed that Brave Bison purchased Social Chain founded by Steven Bartlett for a total sum of £7.7 million, but this could increase if Social Chain meets certain earnings targets.

Clients & partners 
Brave Bison has partnered with clients including:

P&G

NBC Universal

PGA Tour

US Open

Paramount

Australian Open

Hearst US

Comic Relief

European Tour

Alofoke Radio Show

20th Century Fox

Associated Press

Link Up TV

Caribbean Premier League

VOXI

Social Chain

Television appearances
 Toast TV (2013–2014)
 Alex Strangelove (2018)
 World's Worst Flights: Landings (2019)

See also 
 Multi Channel Network

References

External links
 

Multi-channel networks
Companies listed on the Alternative Investment Market